Atomic Records was an independent record label based in Hollywood, California, which was founded in 1945 by trombonist Lyle Griffin. Among the notable recording artists on Atomic were Slim Gaillard, Barney Kessel and Griffin himself. In 1947, Griffin sold Atomic to A. W. Lungren, who became the new head and Griffin left the label. The label lasted until 1955.

Roster
 Buzz Adlam & His Orchestra
 David Allyn
 The Baker Boys
 Chuck Cabot & His Orchestra
 Hugh Cameron
 Miss Danna
 Frank Davenport Quintette
 Esquire's All American New Star Winners
 Slim Gaillard Quartette
 Lyle Griffin Orchestra
 Mel Griggs & His Sons of the Saddle (released on Atomic's Western Series)
 Cee Pee Johnson, His Tom-Toms & His Orchestra
 Betty Hall Jones & Her Rhythm (released on Atomic's Rhythm Series)
 Barney Kessel's All Stars
 Ray Linn's Hollywood Swing Stars
 Dodo Marmarosa Trio
 Candy Morgan
 The Satellites w/Jack LaSalle
 Lucky Thompson

References

External links
Atomic Records on the Internet Archive's Great 78 Project

American independent record labels
Jazz record labels
Defunct companies based in California